The Festival of Code was a yearly event organized by Young Rewired State to motivate young coders to "build something awesome". The festival attracted sponsors ranging from the Met Office to Google and SAP.

In 2016, it was announced that year's Festival of Code would be postponed to 2017, but the event did not occur in 2017 or in subsequent years.

Format 
The Festival of Code occurred over five days, usually in the last week of July to the first week of August. Between Monday and Thursday, participants took part in the festival through one of 67 local centres across the UK, plus two international centres in Kosovo and Bern. Afterwards, between Friday and Sunday, participants all travel to one location within the UK to present their work from the week. In 2015, the weekend was held in Birmingham's International Convention Centre, whereas in 2014 the event was at Plymouth University.

Participants 
In 2009, when the event first started, there were only 50 participants attending a weekend at Google's London offices. This number rose to roughly a thousand young people participating across the country, and at the foreign centres. YRS also managed to increase takeup of the event by young female coders from 2% at their first event in 2009, to 30% in 2014.

See also 
Young Rewired State

References

External links 
 
 Young Rewired State
 Rewired State 
 Hyperlocal 

Computer science education in the United Kingdom
Hackathons
Software development events